Macrocoma rotroui is a species of leaf beetle from Morocco, described by Louis Kocher in 1962. It is possibly a synonym of Macrocoma bolivari.

References

rotroui
Beetles of North Africa
Beetles described in 1962
Endemic fauna of Morocco